Damian Walczak (born 29 July 1984) is a Polish cyclist.

Palmares
2008
1st GP San Giuseppe
2012
1st Puchar Ministra Obrony Narodowej
1st Stage 3 Tour of Bulgaria

References

1984 births
Living people
Polish male cyclists
Place of birth missing (living people)